Amigas & Rivais is a Brazilian telenovela produced and broadcast by SBT from August 6, 2007 to January 18, 2008. It is a remake of the Mexican telenovela Amigas y rivales that produced by Televisa in 2001.

Cast

References

External links 
  

2007 telenovelas
Brazilian telenovelas
2007 Brazilian television series debuts
2008 Brazilian television series endings
Sistema Brasileiro de Televisão telenovelas
Teen telenovelas
Brazilian television series based on Mexican television series
Portuguese-language telenovelas